Rokovoko or Kokovoko is the fictional island home of the character Queequeg, as described in Herman Melville's 1851 novel Moby-Dick. 

Rokovoko is said to be "an island far away to the West and South. It is not down in any map; true places never are", Melville writes. The geography of this island is unclear, but Queequeg is said to have traveled "twenty thousand miles from home, by way of Cape Horn" before arriving in Massachusetts, perhaps placing his home in Polynesia. The island was ruled by Queequeg's father, who is described as both high chief and king. Queequeg's uncle is the island's High Priest. Ishmael feared this island's inhabitants practiced cannibalism.

The spelling of the name differs in the initial British and American editions of the book.

External links
 Moby-Dick: Chapter 12 - Biographical - Queequeg's account of Rokovoko, as presented in Chapter 12 of Moby-Dick.

Fictional islands
Moby-Dick
Fictional locations in Oceania